Shangani may refer to:

Shangani District, central Mogadishu, Somalia
Shangani Patrol - also known as Wilson's Last Stand
Shangani River, Zimbabwe
Shangani language in Zimbabwe
Shangani, Zimbabwe, a farming settlement in Zimbabwe
Shangani people in Mozambique, Zimbabwe and South Africa
Shangani, Stone Town, a ward of Zanzibar City in Stone Town